The 1973–74 season was the 101st season of competitive football in Scotland and the 77th season of Scottish league football.

Scottish League Division One

Champions: Celtic 
Relegated: East Fife, Falkirk

Scottish League Division Two

Promoted: Airdrieonians, Kilmarnock

Cup honours

Other honours

National

County

 – aggregate over two legs – won on penalties

Highland League

Individual honours

Scotland national team

1974 British Home Championship – Joint Winners with 

Key:
(H) = Home match
(A) = Away match
WCQG8 = World Cup qualifying – Group 8
WCG2 = World Cup – Group 2
BHC = British Home Championship

Notes and references

External links
Scottish Football Historical Archive

 
Seasons in Scottish football